Only Saps Work is a 1930 American pre-Code comedy film directed by Cyril Gardner and Edwin H. Knopf and written by Owen Davis, Percy Heath, Joseph L. Mankiewicz and Sam Mintz. The film stars Leon Errol, Richard Arlen, Mary Brian, Stuart Erwin, Anderson Lawler, Charley Grapewin and George Irving. The film was released on December 6, 1930, by Paramount Pictures.

Cast
Leon Errol as James Wilson
Richard Arlen as Lawrence Payne
Mary Brian as Barbara Tanner
Stuart Erwin as Oscar
Anderson Lawler as Horace Baldwin
Charley Grapewin as Simeon Tanner
George Irving as Dr. White
Nora Cecil as Mrs. Partridge
Charles Giblyn as Dr. Jasper
Fred Kelsey as Murphy
G. Pat Collins as Rafferty
George Chandler as Elevator Boy
Jack Richardson as Chef
Clarence Burton as Sergeant Burns
Clifford Dempsey as Detective Smith

References

External links
 

1930 films
1930s English-language films
American comedy films
1930 comedy films
Paramount Pictures films
Films directed by Cyril Gardner
Films directed by Edwin H. Knopf
American black-and-white films
1930s American films